Sir David John Mark Green  (born 1954) is a British lawyer and prosecutor, who served from 2012 until 2018 as the Director of the Serious Fraud Office.

Career

Career at the Bar 
Green was born on 8 March 1954. Educated at Christ's Hospital and then St. Catharine's College, Cambridge, Green initially joined Defence Intelligence in 1975, leaving in 1978, being called to the Bar in 1979 and practising as a barrister. He has served as an assistant Recorder since 1996, and as a Recorder since 2000, when he was also appointed Queen's Counsel.

RCPO 
In 2004, Green was appointed a Director of Customs and Excise, during the creation of HM Revenue and Customs, leading the Revenue and Customs Prosecutions Office (RCPO). He served in that position until 2010, when RCPO started being merged into the Crown Prosecution Service (CPS). He stayed as head until 2011, as the CPS's Director of its Central Fraud Group, being replaced by Sue Patten.

Brief return to private practice 
In April 2011, Green returned to private practise, joining 6 King's Bench Walk chambers. Since his return to the Bar, he has been instructed in complex strategic export cases and as disclosure counsel in a substantial revenue fraud.

SFO 
In 2012, Green was appointed to succeed Richard Alderman as the Director of the Serious Fraud Office. Appointing Green as Director of SFO, Attorney General Dominic Grieve commented:

Green served his original four-year term, and was extended for two years in February 2016. Announcing extension of his appointment, Attorney General Jeremy Wright commented:

As of 2015, Green was paid a salary of between £170,000 and £174,999, making him one of the 328 most highly paid people in the British public sector at that time.

Green left the SFO in April 2018, being replaced temporarily by the chief operating officer, Mark Thompson, and from September 2018 by Lisa Osofsky.  On 22 October 2018, Green joined Magic Circle law firm Slaughter and May as a Senior Consultant.

Fraud Advisory Panel 
on 1 January 2022, Green succeeded David Clarke as Chair of the Fraud Advisory Panel charity.

Notable awards and rankings 
In the Queen's Birthday Honours for 2011, he was appointed Companion of the Order of the Bath (CB). As part of the Queen's Birthday Honours in 2018, Green was made a Knight Bachelor.

See also 
 Criminal justice

References

External links 
 An interview with Green in Fraud magazine from November 2013

Living people
1954 births
20th-century English judges
People educated at Christ's Hospital
British prosecutors
English King's Counsel
21st-century King's Counsel
Members of the Middle Temple
Lawyers from London
21st-century English judges
International criminal law scholars
Companions of the Order of the Bath
Knights Bachelor
Lawyers awarded knighthoods
Civil servants in the Serious Fraud Office (United Kingdom)